The Old Homestead is a 1942 American comedy film directed by Frank McDonald and written by Dorrell McGowan and Stuart E. McGowan. The film stars the vaudeville comedy troupe the Weaver Brothers and Elviry, with Dick Purcell, Jed Prouty and Anne Jeffreys. The film was released on August 17, 1942, by Republic Pictures.

Plot

Cast   
Leon Weaver as Abner Weaver
Frank Weaver as Cicero Weaver
June Weaver as Mayor Elviry Weaver
Dick Purcell as Scarf Lennin
Jed Prouty as Councilman Bell
Anne Jeffreys as Goldie
Maris Wrixon as Mary Jo Weaver
Robert Conway as Fred Morgan
Linda Bent as Bunny

References

External links 
 

1942 films
American comedy films
1942 comedy films
Republic Pictures films
Films directed by Frank McDonald
American black-and-white films
1940s English-language films
1940s American films